Willis Fawley (birth registered fourth ¼ 1929) is an English former professional rugby league footballer who played in the 1960s and 1970s. He played at club level for Featherstone Rovers (Heritage № 323), as an occasional goal-kicking , i.e. number 9, during the era of contested scrums.

Background
Willis Fawley's birth was registered in Pontefract district, West Riding of Yorkshire, England.

Playing career

County Cup Final appearances
Willis Fawley played  in Featherstone Rovers' 15-14 victory over Hull F.C. in the 1959–60 Yorkshire County Cup Final during the 1959–60 season at Headingley Rugby Stadium, Leeds on Saturday 31 October 1959, and played  in the 0-10 defeat by Halifax in the 1963–64 Yorkshire County Cup Final during the 1963–64 season at Belle Vue, Wakefield on Saturday 2 November 1963.

Club career
Willis Fawley made his début for Featherstone Rovers on Saturday 10 March 1951.

Testimonial match
Willis Fawley's benefit season/testimonial match at Featherstone Rovers took place during the 1960–61 season.

Honoured at Featherstone Rovers
Willis Fawley is a Featherstone Rovers Hall of Fame inductee.

Genealogical information
Willis Fawley's marriage to Valerie (née Pearson) was registered during first ¼ 1962 in Pontefract district.

References

External links

Search for "Fawley" at rugbyleagueproject.org
Willis Fawley
November 2015
Keith Bridges
2011

1929 births
Living people
English rugby league players
Featherstone Rovers players
Rugby league hookers
Rugby league players from Pontefract